The sergeant major or píntano (Abudefduf saxatilis) is a species of damselfish.

Distribution and habitat
Abudefduf saxatilis is found in the Atlantic Ocean. Populations in the western part of the Atlantic Ocean are found from the north eastern coast of the United States south to the Gulf of Mexico, the Bahamas, islands around the Caribbean Sea, the eastern coast of Central and South America all the way to Uruguay. In the eastern Atlantic Ocean, they are found from Portugal, Azores, the Canary Islands, Cape Verde, and western Africa. Its distribution remains unclear in the Mediterranean Sea due to possible confusion with Abudefduf vaigiensis and Abudefduf troschelii.
Juveniles are common in tide pools while adults are found over coral reefs.

Description
Abudefduf saxatilis has 13 dorsal spines, 12 to 13 dorsal soft rays, 2 anal spines, and 10 to 12 anal soft rays. This fish is white with a yellow top. It has 5 vertical stripes which are black. A faint sixth stripe might be present on the caudal peduncle. Adult males have a more bluish coloration and its stripes are less visible. There is a dark spot around its pectoral fin.

Ecology

Diet
This fish feeds upon the larvae of invertebrates, zooplankton, smaller fish, crustaceans, and various species of algae. It is also known to feed on the waste and vomit of spinner dolphins.

Behavior
Individuals of this species form shoals of about several hundred individuals. Sometimes, they get cleaned of parasites by fish species such as gobies in the genus Gobiosoma, Bodianus rufus, Elacatinus figaro, and Thalassoma noronhanum. Sergeant majors also clean green sea turtles along with Acanthurus chirurgus and Acanthurus coeruleus.

Predators
Predators of this fish include Plectropomus leopardus, Thalassoma bifasciatum, Cephalopholis cruentata, Epinephelus striatus, Mycteroperca venenosa, and Rachycentron canadum.

In the aquarium
They are found in the aquarium trade but are regarded as difficult to breed.

Reproduction
The sergeant major is an oviparous species in which the males create nests on rocks, reef outcrops, shipwrecks, and pilings where the females lay their egg masses.  The males actively chase the females in courtship before the female releases approximately 200,000 ref, ovoid eggs which are attached to the substrate by a filament; the eggs turn greenish after a few days and are guarded by the male. As he guards the eggs the male becomes bluish in colour, guarding them for about a week.

Etymology
Sergeant majors earn their name from their brightly striped sides, known as bars, which are reminiscent of the insignia of a military sergeant major.

References

External links
 
 Video of Sergeant-Major - Video taken in Belize off Ambergris Caye.

Sergeant major (fish)
Fish of the Atlantic Ocean
Fish described in 1758
Taxa named by Carl Linnaeus